Zorita (born Kathryn Boyd, 30 August 1915 – 12 November 2001) was an American burlesque dancer. She was best known for a twenty-minute dance which she performed with two boa constrictors called 'Elmer and Oscar'.

Early life 
Zorita was born Kathryn Boyd in Youngstown, Ohio in 1915 and was adopted by a strict Methodist couple in Chicago. When she was 15 she worked as a manicurist. Following a client's suggestion because of her full and mature figure, she worked as a stripper at stag parties to earn extra money. 

When she was 17 she moved to San Diego to work in the Zoro Garden Nudist Colony at the California Pacific International Exposition. It was here she built up a friendship with a snake charmer who gave her the two snakes that became part of her act.

After being discovered through a beauty pageant, she began working as a burlesque artist in 1935.

Career 
Zorita became well known for her unique and controversial numbers, such as the 'Half and Half'. She dressed one half of her body as a groom and the other as a bride, and, keeping one side to the audience, began to undress each other, leading to the 'wedding night romp'. In another, an unseen 'spider' removed her clothes whilst she danced in front of a rhinestone-covered spiderweb. However, her most iconic acts involved boa constrictors - an example of one was called 'The Consummation of the Wedding of the Snake'', where she stripped while holding an 8-foot boa constrictor. She described it as: "A gorgeous young maiden is going to be sold into slavery to an ugly old man. Instead, she dances with a snake, gets bitten, and dies."

In another act, she emerges from a giant spiderweb dripping in rhinestones. Dark 'spider's hands' slowly peel off her clothes from the rear.

On August 15, 1941, Zorita was arrested for indecent exposure at the Kentucky Club in Toledo, Ohio. She was found guilty by a jury and sentenced to 6 months imprisonment.

In 1941, Zorita was arrested by the American Society for the Prevention of Cruelty to Animals for her use of snakes in the act - she was also known to walk her snakes on leads in public. She was released on a $1,500 bail, but after her last New York performance all of her snakes were confiscated.

The name 'Zorita' was given to her by Mr Miller, who owned the San Francisco theatre where she was performing.

'Zorita', a song about her, was recorded by the Fields-Madera Orchestra in 1959. The song was written by Sol Marcus and Bennie Benjamin.

She retired from stripping in 1954 and ran several burlesque clubs in New York and Miami before retiring completely in 1974 to breed Persian cats.

Personal life 
Zorita was bisexual. When she was touring venues, her 'girl friend' accompanied her. She was married, the first time at 15, and divorced three times. She later said that she stripped for men, but preferred women.

She died on 12 November 2001, aged 86.

Filmography
 I Married a Savage (1949)
 Naughty New York (1959)
 Judy's Little No-No (1969)
 Revenge Is My Destiny (1971)
 Lenny (1974) (uncredited)

References 

American vedettes
American burlesque performers
1915 births
2001 deaths